Adriano De Pierro (born 11 January 1991) is a Swiss professional footballer who plays for Stade Nyonnais.

Career
De Pierro grew up in the small town of Échandens in Suisse Romande and initially began his career with local club Forward Morges before a move to the academy of FC Lausanne-Sport. Eventually he earned a big move to Swiss Super League side BSC Young Boys in 2009, going on to feature for the reserves and appearing several times for the first-team during his first two years with the club. Looking to gain more playing time, De Pierro went on loan to second division club FC Stade Nyonnais for the duration of the 2011–12 season. Returning to Young Boys, the player went on loan again to a second-tier side, this time joining FC Lugano for the 2012–13 season. In the summer of 2013 De Pierro signed for FC Lausanne-Sport on a two-year contract with an option for a one-year extension. In a bid to reduce their squad, he was allowed to leave Young Boys for Lausanne despite the fact that his contract was set to expire in 2014.

On 1 September 2021, he was loaned by Yverdon to Bellinzona.

References

External links
 

1991 births
People from Morges
Living people
Swiss men's footballers
Association football defenders
Switzerland youth international footballers
BSC Young Boys players
FC Stade Nyonnais players
FC Lugano players
FC Lausanne-Sport players
Yverdon-Sport FC players
AC Bellinzona players
Swiss Super League players
Swiss Challenge League players
Swiss Promotion League players
Swiss 1. Liga (football) players
2. Liga Interregional players
Sportspeople from the canton of Vaud